Saint-Omer-en-Chaussée is a railway station located in the commune of Saint-Omer-en-Chaussée in the Oise department, France.  It is served by TER Hauts-de-France trains from Beauvais to Le Tréport-Mers. The station was first opened on July 1, 1875. The station is accessible for disabled persons. It consists of a simple shelter, a ticket machine and a notice board. Trains cannot pass each other at the station anymore.

History

At Saint-Omer-en-Chaussée, the former Beauvais–Amiens railway connected to the Épinay-Villetaneuse–Le Tréport-Mers railway. The line Beauvais - Amiens was discontinued on January 9, 1939 and the service was replaced with buses. The only remains of the goods station are the far end of the railway junction that led to the Maggi milk factory.

Gallery

See also 
 List of SNCF stations in Hauts-de-France

References

Railway stations in Oise
Railway stations in France opened in 1875